Anchomenus dorsalis is a species of ground beetle in the subfamily Platyninae. It is found in Europe, North Africa, the Middle East and Central Asia.

Description
This beetle is bright green-blue and red-brown in color. The adults are 5.6–7.7 mm long, with females larger than males.

Biology
This beetle forms aggregations of several individuals, often with beetles of the genus Brachinus. When disturbed it releases a volatile that contains undecane. Its coloration may be aposematic mimicry of the similarly colored Brachinus beetles it lives with, which emit a much more powerful antipredator volatile mix.

References

Platyninae
Beetles of North Africa
Beetles of Asia
Beetles of Europe
Beetles described in 1763
Taxa named by Erik Pontoppidan